George Edward Cokayne,  (29 April 1825 – 6 August 1911), was an English genealogist and long-serving herald at the College of Arms in London, who eventually rose to the rank of Clarenceux King of Arms. He wrote such authoritative and standard reference works as The Complete Peerage and The Complete Baronetage.

Origins
Cokayne was born on 29 April 1825, with the surname Adams, being the son of William Adams by his wife the Hon. Mary Anne Cokayne, a daughter of Viscount Cullen. He was baptised George Edward Adams. On 15 August 1873, he changed his surname by Royal Licence to Cokayne. (Such changes were frequently made to meet the terms of bequests from childless relatives, often in the maternal line, who wished to see their name and arms continue.)

Career

Education
He matriculated from Exeter College on 6 June 1844, and graduated BA in 1848 and MA in 1852. He was admitted a student of Lincoln's Inn on 16 January 1850, and was called to the bar on 30 April 1853.

College of Arms
He began his heraldic career at the College of Arms in London with an appointment in 1859 to the post of Rouge Dragon Pursuivant of Arms in Ordinary, and was promoted in 1870 to the office of Lancaster Herald of Arms in Ordinary. In 1882 he was promoted to Norroy King of Arms, which office he held  until his appointment as Clarenceux King of Arms in 1894, which he held until his death in 1911.

The Complete Peerage
Cokayne wrote The Complete Peerage, the first edition of which was published between 1887 and 1898

Marriage and progeny
On 2 December 1856, he married Mary Dorothea Gibbs, daughter of George Henry Gibbs by his wife Caroline Crawley. The couple had eight children, of whom two sons and two daughters survived their father. 

One of his sons, Brien, became Governor of the Bank of England from 1918 to 1920 and was ennobled in 1920 as Baron Cullen of Ashbourne.

Death
George Edward Cokayne died at Roehampton on 6 August 1911, aged 86.

Arms

References

External links

 The Complete Baronetage on Internet Archive 
 The College of Arms
 CUHAGS Officer of Arms Index

1825 births
1911 deaths
English officers of arms
English genealogists
Place of birth missing
Place of death missing
Alumni of Exeter College, Oxford
Members of Lincoln's Inn
Fellows of the Society of Antiquaries of London
Record Society of Lancashire and Cheshire